The United States Citizenship and Immigration Services is a subdivision of the U.S. Department of Homeland Security that adjudicates petitions and processes forms related to citizenship, residency, and various kinds of authorization to live and work in the United States. Many of the forms it processes are prerequisites for people outside the United States who are not United States citizens or permanent residents to obtaining visas to enter the United States in the specified status. Many of the USCIS immigration forms have long processing times. The USCIS offers some guidance regarding expected processing times through its website and through reports. This page describes the USCIS policies, the guidance they offer, and the courses of action in case of higher processing times.

Note that these processing times do not include the processing times for U.S. Department of Labor forms (such as Labor Condition Application and labor certification) that are prerequisites for some USCIS petitions and forms, nor do they include the National Visa Center wait times for immigrant visa numbers, the wait time for getting visas from a U.S. consulate abroad, or border wait times.

Various kinds of USCIS processing 

The USCIS offers processing time information for many different kinds of processing:

 Processing forms (applications and petitions) at its Service Centers: There are four service centers: California Service Center, Nebraska Service Center, Vermont Service Center, and Texas Service Center. All USCIS immigration forms (but not the naturalization forms) go through Service Centers.
 Field Office processing: This is the final stage of processing for some forms that also require in-person interviews. These include Form I-485, Form N-400 and Form N-600. Note that when Form I-485 is filed concurrently with Form I-130, then the Form I-130 is first processed at the Service Center and then the Form I-485 is processed at the field office. The total wait time is the sum of the wait times for both forms.
 National Benefits Center processing: Some USCIS immigration forms go through the NBC. These are Forms I-102, I-131, I-600, I-601A, I-765, I-817, I-824, and I-90.
 Immigrant Investor Program Office processing: This Office processes Form I-526 petitions whose approval allows one to obtain an EB-5 visa).
 International Operations Offices processing: International Operations offices are used for Direct Consular Filing for some forms, notably I-130 (most international offices), Form I-360, and Form I-730 (available only in some offices).
 Administrative Appeals Office processing: This includes processing for appeals to USCIS decisions for most USCIS forms, with the exception of Form I-130 and Form I-360.

The USCIS processing queue 

Each form or petition the USCIS receives is put in a queue for processing once it is received by the part of the USCIS (typically a service center or field office) that will process it. The queue that a form is put in depends on two aspects:

 The service center or field office where the form is being processed.
 The type of form (note that the form number alone does not determine the queue, because there may be many categories that use the same form number; for instance, Form I-129 is used for many different kinds of temporary work authorization, and each of them has a separate queue). Note that after initial review, if the form is awaiting a response from the applicant (to a Request For Evidence, Notice of Intent to Deny, or request for clarification), the application is placed in "active suspense" and is not part of the queue.

The queue operates in a standard first in, first out fashion: a form that is put in the queue at a later date will start being reviewed or adjudicated at a later date (there is an exception for those who use the Premium Processing Service discussed later, that can be used for Form I-129 and Form I-140).

The time between the date of receipt of the form by the service center or field office and the date it is reviewed is called the "processing time" of the form. Due to the way the queue operates, the processing times for forms processed close by in time will be similar. Therefore, to estimate processing times for forms that are currently being reviewed, it suffices to know the date of receipt.

Processing time goals and backlogs 

For each form, USCIS has a processing time goal. These  processing time goals are set by the USCIS Office of Performance and Quality (OPQ) that was established in January 2010.

If the processing time at a given time for a particular service center and form is significantly higher than the processing time goal, USCIS may either increase allocation of resources within the Service Center to process that form, or (in some extreme cases) reallocate some of the caseload to a different service center.

Typical reasons for increased backlog include significant additional demands on USCIS resources due to the introduction of new categories of forms or an increase in usage of existing forms. For instance, in the aftermath of Barack Obama's executive action on Deferred Action for Childhood Arrivals in June 2012, the USCIS faced increased workloads, and this was one of the factors in significantly increased wait times for Form I-130 petitions.

Courses of action for delayed processing 

For Form I-765 applications for an employment authorization document, there is a promised 90-day processing time. If a Form I-765 application is close to or beyond the 90-day processing timeframe, the applicant may take the following actions:

 Contact the USCIS National Customer Service Center
 Submit a case inquiry using DHS Form 7001 to the Ombudsman's Office

For Forms I-129 and I-140, the petitioner may use the Premium Processing Service to get an initial review within 15 calendar days. The petitioner can obtain the Premium Processing Service for an already submitted application and can in fact obtain it electronically. The 15 calendar day clock begins from the time the petitioner's Premium Processing Service application is received by the USCIS.

In general, if a petition or application has not received a response even though the USCIS is showing a later date of applications currently being processed, the petitioner or applicant can file an "outside normal processing time" e-request with the USCIS.

Reporting of processing times 

On the 15th of every month, the USCIS publishes information, for each of its processing queues (i.e., for every combination of service center/field office/other subdivision and form type) the processing time as observed 45 days ago. For instance, on January 15, 2016, the USCIS published this information for forms being processed as of November 30, 2015. The 45-day gap is to allow the USCIS to verify the data for quality. Owing to the 45-day delay in reporting, the information published by USCIS may not be very helpful to applicants for some forms whose processing times fluctuate wildly.

The USCIS reports processing times in two formats for each combination of service center and form type. One is "Estimated time range" that could say something like "2 months to 4 months." The other is "Receipt date for a case inquiry" that gives the average date of forms of that type processed on the date for which the report is being generated. For instance, in the data released on January 15, the USCIS reported the dates of forms being processed (for each combination of service center/field office/other subdivision and form category) as of November 30.

A few other caveats need to be noted when interpreting reported processing times:

 Initial review only; excludes active suspense: While all forms being processed for initial review are processed in the order in which they were received, forms that are re-processed after receiving a response to a Request For Evidence, Notice of Intent to Deny, or a request for clarification from the applicant may not bear a relationship with the date of receipt of the original form. Forms that are awaiting a response from the applicant are said to be in "active suspense". When reporting processing times, the USCIS removes data on forms in active suspense. This is part of the quality control done by the USCIS and is one of the reasons for the 45-day delay in reporting.
 Data skewed by Premium Processing: The USCIS does not separate out data for petitions that have requested the Premium Processing Service, i.e., its estimate of processing time includes both petitions that have requested Premium Processing and those that have not. While this does not affect form categories ineligible for Premium Processing, it does skew the reported processing times for the forms eligible for Premium Processing. For instance, a Form I-129 petition that did not have a Premium Processing Service request will likely take more time to process than the processing time reported by the USCIS.
 Guidelines for processing times for petitions after they receive a response to a RFE or NOID: There are no general processing times reported for petitions after they receive a response to a RFE or NOID, since it varies from case to case, and it is best to communicate directly with the Service Center.

Additional statistics 

The USCIS also publishes quarterly reports (i.e., once every three months) for each form giving detailed statistics (by field office/service center location) of the number of applications received, accepted, denied, and pending.

Premium Processing Service 

The USCIS offers a Premium Processing Service at an additional fee of $2500 for Form I-129 (non-immigrant worker) and Form I-140 (immigrant worker) petitions. This service promises an initial review from the USCIS within 15 calendar days of receipt of the form, after which time it may approve, deny, or issue a Request For Evidence or Notice of Intent to Deny. For the special case of cap-subject H-1B visas where the applications are concentrated in the beginning of April, the start date for the 15-day countdown is generally delayed due to the huge influx of applications.

The Premium Processing Service was introduced in 2001 for Form I-129 and extended to Form I-140 in 2006.

The USCIS has been asked to extend the Premium Processing Service to Form I-526 (for EB-5 investors) and has also formulated proposals to do so, but as of January 2016, still uses the Premium Processing Service only for Forms I-129 and I-140.

See also 
 USCIS immigration forms
 Premium Processing Service

References 

Immigration to the United States
Processing times
Organizational performance management